Miss World 1963, was the 13th edition of the Miss World pageant, was held on 7 November 1963 at the Lyceum Ballroom in London, United Kingdom. The winner was Carole Crawford of Jamaica. She was crowned by Miss World 1962, Catharina Lodders of Holland.

Results

Continental Queens of Beauty

Contestants

  – Diana Sarti
  – Sonja Russ
  – Irène Godin
  – Rosario Lopera
  – Vera Lúcia Ferreira Maia
  – Jane Kmita
  – Jennifer Ann Fonseka
  – María del Pilar Aguirre
  – María Eugenia Cucalón Venegas
  – Maro Zorna
  – Aino Korwa
  – Marja-Liisa Ståhlberg
  – Muguette Fabris
  – Susie Gruner
  – Athanasia Idromenou
  – Hanny IJsebrands
  – María Ragnarsdóttir
  – Joan Power
  – Sara Talmi
  – Carole Joan Crawford
  – Miyako Harada
  – Despo Drakolakis
  – Choi Keum-shil
  – Ethel Zoe Norman
  – Catherine Paulus
  – Catherine Loh
  – Ana Beatriz Martínez Solórzano
  – Elaine Miscall
  – Gina Onyejiaka
  – Lucía Buonnani
  – Maria Penedo
  – Louise Crous
  – Encarnación Zalabardo
  – Virginia Blanche Hardjo
  – Grete Qviberg
  – Claudine Younes
  – Gulseren Kocaman
  – Diana Westbury 
  – Michele Metrinko
  – Milagros Galíndez

Notes

Debuts
 Chile, Colombia, Liberia, Malaysia , Mexico and Nigeria competed in Miss World for the first time.

Returning countries
 Tunisia last competed in 1958.
 Peru last competed in 1959.
 Bolivia, Ceylon, Suriname, and Turkey last competed in 1961.

Other notes
 Denmark placed as 1st runner-up in Miss Universe 1963.
 Ceylon becomes a finalist for the second time, last in 1953.
United Kingdom placed as 1st runner-up in Miss International 1963

References

External links
 Miss World official website
 Pageantopolis – Miss World 1963

Miss World
1963 in London
1963 beauty pageants
Beauty pageants in the United Kingdom
November 1963 events in the United Kingdom